Alderson is a town in Pittsburg County, Oklahoma, United States.  The population was 304 at the 2010 census.

History 
A post office was established at Alderson, Indian Territory on March 5, 1890.  It was named for an employee of the Choctaw, Oklahoma and Gulf Railroad whose full name appears lost.

At the time of its founding, Alderson was located in Tobucksy County, a part of the Moshulatubbee District of the Choctaw Nation.

Geography

Demographics

As of the census of 2010, there were 304 people living in the town.  The population density was 610 people per square mile (220/km). There were 129 housing units at an average density of 225 per square mile (90/km).  The racial makeup of the town was 67.05% White, 3.45% African American, 18.77% Native American, 0.38% Asian, 0.38% from other races, and 9.96% from two or more races. Hispanic or Latino of any race were 1.92% of the population.

There were 97 households, out of which 36.1% had children under the age of 18 living with them, 57.7% were married couples living together, 7.2% had a female householder with no husband present, and 29.9% were non-families. 27.8% of all households were made up of individuals, and 10.3% had someone living alone who was 65 years of age or older. The average household size was 2.69 and the average family size was 3.32.

In the town, the population was spread out, with 31.8% under the age of 18, 6.9% from 18 to 24, 25.3% from 25 to 44, 22.2% from 45 to 64, and 13.8% who were 65 years of age or older. The median age was 37 years. For every 100 females, there were 107.1 males. For every 100 females age 18 and over, there were 97.8 males.

The median income for a household in the town was $23,750, and the median income for a family was $31,250. Males had a median income of $23,750 versus $17,292 for females. The per capita income for the town was $11,513. About 14.0% of families and 20.0% of the population were below the poverty line, including 18.2% of those under the age of eighteen and 26.7% of those sixty five or over.

References

External links
 Encyclopedia of Oklahoma History and Culture - Alderson

Towns in Oklahoma
Towns in Pittsburg County, Oklahoma